May Emma Campbell (née Pearce) MBE (2 November 1915, in Wagin, Western Australia – 16 February 1981) was a field hockey player who represented Australia in the sport from 1935 to 1948.  From the tiny wheatbelt town of Moulyinning, her career spanned 50 years as a player, coach, selector and administrator in several Australian states as well as national duties.  She was considered one of Western Australia's and Australia's greatest players, with Indian champion Dhyan Chand saying of her: "May Campbell is one of the finest players I have seen, man or woman."

As a player, 1936 was May Campbell's best year: on the Australian tour of the United States and Canada she was Australia's highest goalscorer, she also toured England and New Zealand, and managed a haul of 100 goals in club, national and international matches.  In 1938, she scored 20 of WA's 30 goals in the National Championships.  During her many years as Western Australian captain, the state failed to win the national title only twice.

Campbell played local hockey with Surf Hockey Club (now YMCA Coastal City Hockey Club) with sisters Jean Wynne, (also played for Australia from 1946 to 1953), Morna Hyde (played for Australia in the late 1940s) and Caroline "Tib" Ash.   May, Jean and Norma all captained the Australian Women's hockey team and the state team at various times and Tib also played at State and national levels.  
 
She was made a Member of The Order of the British Empire (Civil) in 1980 and during the WAY 1979 celebrations, was named as the all-time great of women's hockey.   She was inducted into the Western Australian Hall of Champions in 1986.  The "May Campbell Service to Sport Award" is given annually to a sports administrator who has displayed outstanding service to sport in the state.

By coincidence, the four hockey playing Pearce sisters shared the same surname as the five Anglo-Indian hockey playing brothers, Cec, Mel, Eric, Gordon and Julian Pearce.  Both sets of siblings played for Western Australia and Australia with the sisters dominating in the 1930s through to the mid 60s and the brothers in the 1950s and 60s.

John Hyde, MLA for Perth, is Morna Pearce's son and hence May's nephew.

References

Further reading

1915 births
1981 deaths
Australian female field hockey players
People from Wagin, Western Australia
Field hockey people from Western Australia